The Oklahoma Sooners college football team compete as part of the National Collegiate Athletic Association (NCAA) Division I Football Bowl Subdivision, representing the University of Oklahoma in the Big 12 Conference. Oklahoma has played their home games at Oklahoma Memorial Stadium in Norman, Oklahoma since 1923.

The Sooners claim seven national championships. They have also recorded 50 conference championships, 12 undefeated and untied regular seasons, and the longest winning streak in Division I history with 47 straight victories. The Oklahoma football program is one of the most successful programs in history, having won 934 games and possessing a .725 winning percentage, both sixth all time. As of the end of the 2022 season, Oklahoma has appeared in the AP poll 882 times, including 101 No. 1 rankings, both third all time.

Football was introduced to the university by John A. Harts in 1895. Harts, a student from Kansas who had played the game in his home state, presided over a single game, a loss to a more experienced team from the Oklahoma City High School. The university had its first paid coach in Vernon Louis Parrington, who led the Sooners to a record of nine wins, one loss, and two ties over four seasons. Hired in 1905, Bennie Owen brought Oklahoma to the national stage during his 22-year tenure as head coach. He retired with a 122–54–16 record, including four seasons in which the team went unbeaten. During Owen's tenure, Oklahoma became a charter member of the Southwest Conference, in which they remained for five years before leaving to join the Missouri Valley Intercollegiate Athletic Association. The MVIAA conference would later transform into the Big Six, Big Seven, and finally the Big Eight Conference.

In 1947, Oklahoma promoted Bud Wilkinson, then an assistant coach, to head coach. Wilkinson led the Sooners to national championships in 1950, 1955 and 1956, as well as a stretch of 47 consecutive victories that began in 1953 and ended in 1957. Wilkinson's tenure included a streak of 13 consecutive conference championships (in addition to one by his predecessor). After 17 seasons at the helm, Wilkinson retired with a 145–29–4 record.

Oklahoma continued to perform well after Wilkinson left, but only returned to the national title picture following the promotion of Barry Switzer to head coach in 1973. The Sooners won the Big Eight in each of his first eight years as coach and earned national championships in 1974 and 1975. Switzer added Oklahoma's sixth national championship in 1985 and bested Wilkinson's school record for victories by a coach, stepping down prior to the 1989 season with a 157–29–4 record.

After a decline that lasted more than a decade, Oklahoma again won the national championship in 2000, after coach Bob Stoops had been hired the previous year. By then Oklahoma had joined a new conference, the Big 12 Conference, formed as a combination of the Big Eight Conference and four Texas schools of the defunct Southwest Conference. Stoops coached 239 games during his time at Oklahoma, winning 191 of them. Both figures are the most of any coach in school history. Stoops won ten conference championships and led the Sooners to the BCS National Championship Game four times. However, 2000 remains Oklahoma's most recent championship game victory. Lincoln Riley, who succeeded Stoops as coach in 2017, took the Sooners to the College Football Playoff four times, losing in the semifinal round on each occasion. Following Riley's departure, current head coach Brent Venables was appointed to the position.

Through the 2022 season, Oklahoma has compiled an overall record of 934 wins, 338 losses, and 53 ties. The Sooners have appeared in 56 bowl games, most recently in the 2022 Cheez-It Bowl, with 31 bowl victories in their history.

Seasons

1 When in a division, it shows their position within the division otherwise the overall position in the division-less conference.
2 Overtime rules in college football were introduced in 1996, making ties impossible in the period since.

Notes

References

Oklahoma Sooners

Oklahoma Sooners football seasons